Cuspidia is a genus of flowering plants in the daisy family.

There is only one known species, Cuspidia cernua, native to the Cape Province region of South Africa.

References

Monotypic Asteraceae genera
Arctotideae
Endemic flora of South Africa
Taxa named by Joseph Gaertner